Ardnaglug is a townland in Athlone in County Westmeath, Ireland. The townland is in the civil parish of St. Mary's.

The townland lies to the east of Athlone City Centre. The Athlone to Mullingar Cycleway which is part of the cross country Dublin-Galway Greenway forms the northern border.

References 

Townlands of County Westmeath